Brainbox Challenge is a British game show hosted by Clive Anderson and produced by BBC Manchester. It was broadcast weekdays on BBC Two, for most of its run in an evening slot, but in a lunchtime slot for its final week.

The show features rounds including "Memory", "Language", "Visual and Spatial", "Numerical" and "Coding".

Each episode features five head-to-head challenges based on these different skills. The winner of each challenge becomes the "Brainbox Champion" and is shown a picture of their next challenger, along with their name, age, and occupation. The champion is then given the chance to leave with their winnings ("take the cheque") or face that opponent ("take the challenge"). If they choose to take the challenge, they risked losing some or all of the money they had won if defeated by challengers. However, any money won in the bonus round was safe. If they chose to take the cheque, the new challenger would take the champion's podium, and a successive challenger would be introduced.

The theoretical maximum winnings for any contestant were £13,000.

External links
 

BBC television game shows
2000s British game shows
2008 British television series debuts
2008 British television series endings